Japan Society for Industrial and Applied Mathematics (JSIAM) is a Japanese non-profit organization for the field of applied mathematics. JSIAM is not a branch but a Japanese counterpart of the Society for Industrial and Applied Mathematics (SIAM) based in the United States.

Activities
As same as SIAM, JSIAM publishes academic journals in Japanese and English, hold academic conferences, and give awards to applied mathematicians with JSIAM membership.

English Journals and Publications from JSIAM
 SIAM Online Magazine
 JJIAM (Japan Journal of Industrial and Applied Mathematics)
 JSIAM Letters

Finance
The finance of JSIAM is based on membership fee and support from their corporate sponsors. Their sponsors include Canon, Nissan, NEC, NTT, Hitachi, Fujitsu and Ricoh.

Contributions to EASIAM

EASIAM (East Asia Section of SIAM) aims to advance the studies of applied mathematics in eastern Asia. As part of the Eastern Asian community, JSIAM is partially supporting EASIAM. Within their support, EASIAM is publishing the East Asian Journal of Applied Mathematics from the Global Science Press, and hold the EASIAM conference every year.

ICIAM 2023
JSIAM has announced that they will be organizing the International Congress on Industrial and Applied Mathematics in 2023 with the Mathematical Society of Japan.

Notes

See also
 Japan Society for the Promotion of Science
 Society for Industrial and Applied Mathematics

Applied mathematics
Non-profit organizations based in Japan
1990 establishments in Japan